Linares del Acebo is one of 54 parish councils in Cangas del Narcea, a municipality within the province and autonomous community of Asturias, in northern Spain.

Villages
 Bornazal
 Brañamiana
 El Cabanal
 Castilmoure
 Ḷḷinares
 L'Acebu

References

Parishes in Cangas del Narcea